McConachie may refer to:

Alexander McConachie (1840–1913), British businessman
Grant McConachie (1909–1965), Canadian bush pilot and businessman
Robert McConachie, British footballer
McConachie, Edmonton, a neighbourhood in Edmonton, Alberta, Canada

See also
Clark McConachy (1895–1980), New Zealand billiards player
McConaghy
McConaughy